The Last Manuscript is a 1987 Hungarian drama film directed by Károly Makk. It was entered into the 1987 Cannes Film Festival.

Cast
 Jozef Króner - György Nyáry
 Aleksander Bardini - Márk (as Aleksander Bardin)
 Eszter Nagy-Kálózy - Flóra
 Irén Psota - Vica - Mrs. Nyáry
 Béla Both - Franz
 Hédi Váradi - Emilia
 Gyula Babos
 János Bán
 László Dés
 Judit Hernádi
 László Mensáros - György Nyáry (voice)

References

External links

1987 films
1980s Hungarian-language films
1987 drama films
Films directed by Károly Makk
Hungarian drama films